FK Mladost Bački Jarak (Serbian Cyrillic: ФК Младост Бачки Јарак) is a football club based in Bački Jarak, Temerin, Serbia. Mladost currently plays in Vojvodina League South, 4th tier of Serbian football.

History
FK Mladost was founded in 1947. The club's biggest success came in the 1990s when Mladost played in the First League of FR Yugoslavia in B group. Since relegation from B league the club spent most of its time in third tier of Serbian football. Mladost almost reached Serbian First League in season 2008–09, when the club was leading promotion race until the final few games, but they failed to promote, finishing third, six points behind FK Proleter Novi Sad. After many years in third tier, the club relegated in season 2012–13. Since then, they play in Novosadsko-Sremska Zona.

On 8 June 2016 Mladost won the Vojvodina Cup for the first time in club history, beating FK Borac Sakule 4–2 on penalties (0–0 after 90 minutes), and qualified for Serbian Cup 1/16 finals. This is considered as the biggest success in modern history of the club. Match was played at Karađorđe Stadium, Novi Sad.

Rivalries
FK Mladost main rival is FK Sloga Temerin. They are local rivals. Two stadiums are separated by only 3 km.

Fans
Supporters of FK Mladost are called Djavoli (Devils).

References

 Club profile and squad at Srbijafudbal

Football clubs in Serbia
Football clubs in Vojvodina
Association football clubs established in 1947
1947 establishments in Serbia